Miles Morgan (1616 – 28 May 1699) was a Welsh colonist of America, a pioneer settler of what was to become Springfield, Massachusetts. Being one of the few settlers whose homesteads were successfully defended during the Attack on Springfield, Morgan was lauded as a hero of King Philip's War in 1675 for providing shelter and successfully contacting troops in Hadley. Today, a statue of Miles Morgan stands in the city's Court Square in Metro Center.

Biography
Of Welsh ancestry, he was born in Llandaff, Glamorganshire, Wales to William Morgan (of Dderw).  Legend has it that he arrived with his older brothers, James and John, sailing from Bristol on the ship "Mary" and arriving at Boston in April, 1636. They lived in Roxbury, MA for a time. James subsequently moved to Plymouth Colony and later settled in New Haven, CT, where he became a member of the Colonial Assembly of Connecticut and fought in the Pequot War. John grew disgusted with the bigotry, superstition, and the persecutions (including the witch trials) then taking place in New England and moved to Virginia. Miles joined the company of Sir William Pynchon in the colonization of western Massachusetts and was one of the founders of the city of Springfield, originally named Agawam after the Indian tribes that lived in the area.

One of the company of colonists, Miles, though he was only 21 years of age, quickly became the second-in-command. He was one of the leading citizens of the new town and was regarded as an intrepid Indian fighter, farmer, and town leader. He had been given the title of "Sergeant Morgan" on the journey from Boston. in addition to establishing the farms that meant survival to the colonists he was also the butcher in the community and, in later years, operated a boat on the Connecticut River, trading with other colonists and with the Indians. He was subsequently known as "Captain Morgan." Unable to read or write, his mark on the town records was the sign of an anchor.

On the voyage from Bristol he had made the acquaintance of Miss Prudence Gilbert, who was emigrating to the New World with her family. Once settled in Agawam he had a letter written to Prudence, who had settled in Beverly, north of Boston, and proposed marriage. She accepted and in 1642, accompanied by an Indian guide, a pack horse, and two companions, Miles set out for Beverly, where the couple were married. Prudence, her possessions piled on the horse, walked the 120 miles back to Springfield with her new husband.

Morgan built one of the few fortified houses in  town, (on a bank of the Connecticut River (In the late 19th century, the site of Morgan's blockhouse was occupied by the car shops of the Connecticut River Railroad), was active in the militia, and was depended upon in the protection of the frontier town. During the fighting that swept the colony during King Philip's War in 1675 the Indians attacked Springfield, nearly destroying the town. Many of the citizens took refuge in Morgan's house, and under his command, held off the attack. An Indian servant who worked for Morgan managed to escape and alerted the Massachusetts Bay troops under the command of Major Samuel Appleton, who broke through to Springfield and drove off the attackers.

Morgan's sons were also famous Indian fighters in the territory and one of them, Peletiah, was killed by the Indians in battle in 1675. Miles appears in the records as a Selectman, Constable, Surveyor, Fence Viewer, and overseer of highways. He was also appointed to sit in the balcony of the church during services and maintain order among the young men in the congregation. ("...up in ye gallery, to give a check to disorders in youth and young men in tyme of God's worship"). Given the piety of the early settlers this was a position of some honor and also attests to his force of personality. Not all their time was spent in church, however. According to the records, in 1673 Hannah Merrick, unmarried daughter of Thomas Merrick, accused Miles's son Jonathan with the paternity of her child. Miles provided his son's bail and Jonathan fought the charge. The court found him guilty, however, and ordered him to pay two shillings, six pence towards the child's support for four years. Jonathan's second wife eventually got a full confession from Hannah (the records do not indicate how) and Hannah was condemned to pay a fine of seven Pounds or receive twenty lashes as punishment for her perjury. Jonathan, not letting matters lie, then filed a suit charging slander against Hannah's father, but lost. Eight years later Miles was again in trouble over a child. His daughter Lydia worked in the household of the family of Samuel Gaines, who became the father of her child. Miles filed charges and won his suit and Mr. Gaines was ordered to pay child support.

Additional information:  By 1658, Morgan is listed as a sergeant in the local militia. On 5 October 1675, Springfield was attacked by the native inhabitants, and Morgan's blockhouse became a fortress of the place, and, after the burning of the settlement, held out until messengers had been despatched to Hadley.  Captain Samuel Appleton, with a force of men (the standing army of the Massachusetts Bay Colony), marched to Springfield and raised the siege.

Miles Morgan died on 28 May 1699 in Springfield, Massachusetts, and is buried there.

Memorial
A bronze statue of Captain Miles Morgan in Court Square in Springfield shows him in huntsman's dress and cocked hat, with a rifle over his shoulder. This statue, completed in 1882, was the first important work of Jonathan Scott Hartley.

Captain Morgan was a direct ancestor of financier John Pierpont Morgan.

See also
 King Philip's War

Notes

References
 
 
 

Attribution

1616 births
1699 deaths
History of Springfield, Massachusetts
People of colonial Massachusetts
Kingdom of England emigrants to Massachusetts Bay Colony
Morgan family